Valeria Savinykh and Maryna Zanevska were the defending champions, but neither player chose to participate.

Veronika Kudermetova and Galina Voskoboeva won the title, defeating Timea Bacsinszky and Vera Zvonareva in the final 7–5, 6–4.

Seeds

Draw

External Links
Main Draw

2018 Doubles
Open de Limoges - Doubles